The 2001–02 Creighton Bluejays men's basketball team represented Creighton University during the 2001–02 NCAA Division I men's basketball season. The Bluejays, led by head coach Dana Altman, played their home games at the Omaha Civic Auditorium. The Jays finished with a 23-9 record, and tied for the Missouri Valley Conference regular season championship with Southern Illinois.   Creighton won the conference tournament to earn a bid to the 2002 NCAA tournament.  The team featured Missouri Valley Player of the Year Kyle Korver.

Roster

Schedule
 
|-
!colspan=9| Regular season

|-
!colspan=9| Missouri Valley Conference tournament

|-
!colspan=9| 2002 NCAA tournament

|}

References

Creighton
Creighton
Creighton Bluejays men's basketball seasons
Creighton Bluejays men's bask
Creighton Bluejays men's bask